Admiral Sir Reginald Henry Portal  (6 September 1894 – 18 June 1983) was a Royal Navy officer and naval aviation pioneer who served in both world wars.

Biography 
Born near Hungerford, Berkshire, Reginald Portal was the second son of Edward Robert Portal, JP, DL, a country gentleman. His elder brother was Charles Frederick Algernon Portal, later Marshal of the Royal Air Force the Viscount Portal of Hungerford. The family was Huguenot in origin and Reginald Portal was related to the goldsmith and dramatist Abraham Portal, and more distantly so to Wyndham Portal, 1st Viscount Portal.

Portal joined the Royal Navy in 1907 and served in the battleship HMS Neptune before the First World War. As an air observer, he received the Distinguished Service Cross during the war for conspicuous bravery in combat over the Dardanelles, when he was wounded. He was assigned to the seaplane carrier HMS Ark Royal as an observer, before returning to general service on the battleship HMS Colossus.

References 

1894 births
1983 deaths
Royal Navy admirals
Royal Navy admirals of World War II
Royal Navy officers of World War I
Knights Commander of the Order of the Bath
Recipients of the Distinguished Service Cross (United Kingdom)
Royal Naval Air Service personnel of World War I
Military personnel from Berkshire